The 1997–98 Colorado Avalanche season was the Avalanche's third season.

Regular season

Season standings

Schedule and results

Playoffs

Western Conference Quarterfinals

Player statistics

Note: Pos = Position; GP = Games played; G = Goals; A = Assists; Pts = Points; +/- = plus/minus; PIM = Penalty minutes; PPG = Power-play goals; SHG = Short-handed goals; GWG = Game-winning goals; MIN = Minutes played; W = Wins; L = Losses; T = Ties; GA = Goals-against; GAA = Goals-against average; SO = Shutouts; SA = Shots against; SV = Shots saved; SV% = Save percentage

Awards and records

Transactions

Draft picks
Colorado's draft picks at the 1997 NHL Entry Draft held at the Civic Arena in Pittsburgh, Pennsylvania.

See also
1997–98 NHL season

References

General

The Internet Hockey Database
Colorado Avalanche Database
Official National Hockey League Site

C
C
1997-98
Colorado
Colorado